is a Japanese film director, screenwriter, and actor.

Life and career
Mitsuru Meike's introduction to the film industry was as assistant director to prominent female pink film director Sachi Hamano. He later worked at Outcast Produce with Toshiya Ueno and under the mentorship of  director, Toshiki Satō, whom he served as assistant director beginning in 1992. Meike's directorial debut was with the V-cinema film,  (1996). He made his theatrical directorial debut in 1997 with Shintōhō Eiga's Lascivious Nurse Uniform Diary: Two or Three Times, While I'm Wet for which he won the Best New Director prize at the Pink Grand Prix. His 2002 film Shameful Family: Pin Down Technique won Meike the Best Director title, and was named the fifth best pink release of the year at the Pink Grand Prix.

Meike is one of the most experimental and daring of the shichifukujin directors. His 2003 film The Glamorous Life of Sachiko Hanai concerns a call-girl who becomes a super-genius after she is inadvertently shot by a North Korean in negotiations with a Middle Eastern man in a coffee shop. A frantic search for a rubber model of George W. Bush's finger, capable of releasing the U.S.'s nuclear arsenal, ensues. The film became a surprise international hit, playing at 20 film festivals and having a theatrical release in the U.S. in 2006.

Award-winning films

"Ten Best" films, Pink Grand Prix
 1997 7th place: 
 1998 8th place: 
 2002 5th place: 
 2004 10th place:

Pinky Ribbon Awards
 2004 Pearl Prize:

Bibliography

English

Japanese

References

 
|-
! colspan="3" style="background: #DAA520;" | Pink Grand Prix
|-

|-

1969 births
Japanese male film actors
Japanese film directors
Pink film directors
Japanese screenwriters
Living people
People from Yokohama